The British Rail Class 442 (5-WES) Wessex Electrics were electric multiple unit passenger trains introduced in 1988 by Network SouthEast on the South West Main Line from London Waterloo to Weymouth to coincide with the electrification of the line from Bournemouth. Twenty-four five-car units were built by British Rail Engineering Limited's Derby Litchurch Lane Works.

Following the privatisation of British Rail, the fleet was sold to Angel Trains and operated by South West Trains up until February 2007, when they were replaced by Class 444 and Class 450s. After a period in storage, they were leased to Southern for use on Gatwick Express services from London Victoria to Gatwick Airport and Brighton. The units were withdrawn from Gatwick Express services in 2016 and from Southern peak-hour London Bridge to Brighton and Eastbourne services in March 2017. From 2019, eighteen were leased by South Western Railway for use on London Waterloo to Portsmouth Harbour services. However they were again withdrawn in March 2020 due to services being reduced as a result of the COVID-19 pandemic. In March 2021, South Western Railway announced it would purchase all 18 from Angel Trains and scrap them.

The class holds the world speed record for a third-rail train, having attained  on a test run prior to entering service.

Description

The Class 442 is based on the British Rail Mark 3 carriage bodyshell, and has a number of features which distinguish it from the slam-door units it replaced:
All vehicles are air-conditioned, and have powered internal doors and external plug doors.
Units consist of five vehicles, and operate as 5 or 10-car trains, replacing 4-car units which operated as 4, 8 or 12-car trains.

As was common on the British Rail Southern Region, many electrical components – including traction motors and electrical control gear – were salvaged from the Class 432 units they replaced. For this reason, the older 4REP and 4TC units had to be withdrawn before their replacements were built.

The 442 units are unique among all of the various Mark 3-based multiple-unit classes in that they use the full-length 23-metre version of the Mark 3 bodyshell with sealed, non-opening windows - hence they bear a very close resemblance to the coaching stock used in both HST sets and loco-hauled expresses.

The Class 442 was one of the first types to make extensive use of plastics in construction hence the nickname "Plastic Pig".

Dot matrix destination signs were originally provided on the top of the nose end gangway. They were removed in the early 1990s, due to legibility issues, and reinstalled at a different position in 2008, in preparation for service on the Gatwick Express.

Operations

Network SouthEast

The first unit was handed over to Network SouthEast on 18 December 1987. The units were initially used solely on the Weymouth line, but through the 1990s began to be used on the London Waterloo to Portsmouth Direct Line.

South West Trains

As part of the privatisation of British Rail, the Class 442s were sold to Angel Trains and leased to South West Trains. Unit 442402 soon had an orange stripe added to its Network SouthEast livery, which looked very similar to Stagecoach's corporate image. From 1998, the units began to receive the new South West Trains livery of white, red and blue as they underwent overhaul at Crewe Works. Unit 442404 was the first to be so treated.

During the late 1990s and early 2000s, the fleet continued to operate express services from London to both Weymouth and Portsmouth. However, in 2004, when the Class 444s entered service, the 442s were again used solely on the Weymouth line. In early 2006, the fleet began to receive overhauls, with units emerging in a slightly revised livery which conformed with the Disability Discrimination Act. By January 2007 14 of the 24 units had received overhauls.

Despite their recent overhauls, South West Trains withdrew the entire fleet in 2007. They were replaced by Class 444s, augmented by Class 450s, spare from the re-introduction of Class 458s.

The last Class 442 Weymouth to London Waterloo operation was on 24 January 2007 with the final service on 3 February 2007. The units were moved from Bournemouth Traincare Depot to Eastleigh Works for warm storage.

Southern/Gatwick Express

Southern leased 17 to operate the extended Gatwick Express service which began in December 2008. Originally, some units were kept out of service for spare parts. In October 2008, unit 442414 became the first unit to be fully refurbished inside and out.

The new extended Gatwick Express service was introduced on 15 December 2008. The new service, operating Monday to Friday, comprised six services in the morning from Brighton and six services to Brighton in the evening with an additional service terminating at Haywards Heath.

In addition, some peak-hour services to/from London Bridge to Brighton and Eastbourne were operated by pairs of Class 442s. In April 2009. Southern took an extra two units from Eastleigh Works to make up for the shortfall in units caused by their use on other services.

When Govia retained the Southern franchise, it was announced that the remaining off-lease 442s would return to service after an overhaul to replace Class 460s. In 2012, the branding on the units was modified to read simply 'Express' rather than 'Gatwick Express' to avoid passenger confusion when used on fast Brighton Main Line services that do not call at Gatwick.

Govia ordered Class 387/2 EMUs for the Brighton and Gatwick Express routes. The 387s began to enter service on 29 February 2016, with the Class 442s phased out by the end of 2016, with the exception of the Brighton and Eastbourne peak-time commuter services that continued to be operated by a pair of 442s until March 2017.

The last passenger service was on 10 March 2017 which was the 17:57 London Bridge to Brighton formed of units 442410 and 442413. A railtour ran on 12 March 2017 by units 442402 and 442408 commemorated the final send off to the entire fleet from services on the Brighton Main Line. All were taken to Ely for storage.

South Western Railway
In March 2017, South Western Railway (SWR) was awarded the South Western franchise, announcing plans to refurbish and enter 18 Class 442s into service for use on London Waterloo to Portsmouth services.

SWR awarded Kiepe Electric a contract to undertake the £45m refurbishment. Work was to include replacing the life-expired DC traction equipment (salvaged from older trains built during the 1960s) with an AC package incorporating IGBT technology from Kiepe Electric Düsseldorf. New brake controls from Knorr-Bremse Rail Vehicle Systems would have permitted regenerative braking.

Delays led to the first services of refurbished units due to begin in May 2019. However, problems with the door locks caused the trains to be temporarily removed from service again until June 2019 for the fault to be rectified.

The same limited service continued until 2 September 2019, when they were withdrawn from service due to fears that the units were wrongly turning signals to danger as the train approached them. It was thought to be around the Earlsfield area that they were doing this which caused delays on the busy section of track they operated on. The withdrawal of the trains continued until the issue was resolved and testing of the units was undertaken, allowing the class to re-enter service on 6 January 2020 beginning on the London Waterloo to Portsmouth route this time.

Due to the COVID-19 pandemic, on 18 March 2020, all were again taken out of service following the subsequent reduction of service levels. This became the last time that the units would see service as, in March 2021, South Western Railway purchased all 18 from Angel Trains and planned to scrap them. SWR replaced them with rebuilt Class 458s. All had received new interiors and 14 of the 18 had been fitted with new traction equipment. All were taken to Wolverton Works for component recovery before being sent by road to Sims Metal, Newport for scrapping.

Other proposals
The Department for Transport gave bidders for the TransPennine Express franchise the option of using Class 442s. However, the winning bidder did not take up the option.

In November 2016, Alliance Rail Holdings announced plans to use the 442s on a new intercity express service which would operate on the South West Main Line between London Waterloo and Southampton Central under the Grand Southern brand. The proposal was rejected by the Office of Rail & Road on 1 August 2018. The services would have operated as intercity services with each 5-car train offering around 300 seats.

In February 2020 the first two sets (442405 and 442424) were scrapped at Eastleigh.

Preservation
In 2016 a driving car from 442401 was nominated for the National Collection. After the National Railway Museum declined to take the nominated carriage, 77382, it was placed in the custody of Northumbria Rail, Bedlington.

A cab from 442405 has also been preserved at The Cab Yard at Cynhiedre, Wales.

Accidents and incidents
On 3 September 1989, unit 442407 ran away at Bournemouth Depot and overran buffers.
On 7 August 2016, a passenger travelling on unit 442411 was fatally injured when his head struck a signal gantry near Balham, south London. He had been leaning out of the window opposite the guard's compartment in the central carriage. This window could not be locked and there was no bar in place to prevent passengers from leaning out of it.
On 21 January 2020, a locked brake caused smoke to fill one of the carriages on unit 442413. Unlike modern stock, the 442s have no driver indication of such a fault. When the problem was discovered, the train was halted at Petersfield and passengers were evacuated. The passengers praised the actions of the staff and train crew at the scene.

Fleet details

Units were numbered 442401–442424 and were formed of two driving trailers, two intermediate trailers, and an intermediate motor vehicle. In accordance with Southern Region practice, the units only carried the last four digits of their unit numbers when in service with Network SouthEast and South West Trains. Once refurbished for Southern, and subsequently South Western Railway, the units carried the full six digits.

The motor buffet vehicles were all modernised in a works programme at Crewe Works in 1997/98. At the same time units were repainted from their original Network SouthEast livery into South West Trains white livery. During 2006 Angel Trains sent some units to Bombardier at Ilford, where the livery was modified to make it DDA compliant; however, not all trains were modified as it was later announced that the trains were to be withdrawn from service. In 2008, units started to go to Wolverton Works for refurbishment. The refurbishment included the removal of the buffet from the motor coach, all new seats, and the relocation of first class from the front of the train to the motor coach.

List

During the years of Network SouthEast and South West Trains, various units have received names. Most of these were towns or places along the routes that they worked, but a few were for publicity purposes. When the South West Trains lease expired all nameplates were removed.

Notes

References

External links

442
442
Train-related introductions in 1988